Pleated linen is a form of processing linen which results in a fabric which is heavily pleated and does not crease like normal linen fabric.

History 
 The earliest form of pleated linen dates from ancient Egypt and can be seen in a garment known as the Tarkhan dress, which is over 5000 years old and is believed to be one of the oldest dresses in existence. Other examples of pleated linen from ancient history include pleated linen from the tomb of queen Neferu. The Museum of Fine Arts, Boston has in its collection four excellently preserved pleated linen dresses, all found in 1902-1903 by George A. Reisner at the cemetery of Naga ed-Deir in Egypt. It is not known exactly how the Egyptians pleated linen, but the material may have been "folded, accordion style, then tied, and wetted."

Modern use 

In the 1950s the Irish fashion designer, Sybil Connolly, developed a method of hand-pleating linen with the handkerchief linen manufacturer Spence Bryson. Handkerchief linen is a light form of linen, and this pleating process used 9 yards of the material to create 1 yard of pleated linen. The pleating of the fabric meant that unlike other linen garments, ones made with pleated linen were uncrushable, could be packed without becoming creased and maintained their shape. First Lady Jacqueline Kennedy selected a pleated linen creation by Sybil Connolly when she sat for an official Aaron Shikler White House portrait in 1970. Sybil was reportedly very protective of her pleating method, saying it was a secret she would “carry to the grave.”

Gallery

See also
Delphos gown

References 

Woven fabrics